In physics, the Lorentz transformations are a six-parameter family of linear transformations from a coordinate frame in spacetime to another frame that moves at a constant velocity relative to the former. The respective inverse transformation is then parameterized by the negative of this velocity. The transformations are named after the Dutch physicist Hendrik Lorentz.

The most common form of the transformation, parametrized by the real constant  representing a velocity confined to the -direction, is expressed as

Expressing the speed as  an equivalent form of the transformation is

Frames of reference can be divided into two groups: inertial (relative motion with constant velocity) and non-inertial (accelerating, moving in curved paths, rotational motion with constant angular velocity, etc.). The term "Lorentz transformations" only refers to transformations between inertial frames, usually in the context of special relativity.

In each reference frame, an observer can use a local coordinate system (usually Cartesian coordinates in this context) to measure lengths, and a clock to measure time intervals. An event is something that happens at a point in space at an instant of time, or more formally a point in spacetime. The transformations connect the space and time coordinates of an event as measured by an observer in each frame.

They supersede the Galilean transformation of Newtonian physics, which assumes an absolute space and time (see Galilean relativity). The Galilean transformation is a good approximation only at relative speeds much less than the speed of light. Lorentz transformations have a number of unintuitive features that do not appear in Galilean transformations. For example, they reflect the fact that observers moving at different velocities may measure different distances, elapsed times, and even different orderings of events, but always such that the speed of light is the same in all inertial reference frames. The invariance of light speed is one of the postulates of special relativity.

Historically, the transformations were the result of attempts by Lorentz and others to explain how the speed of light was observed to be independent of the reference frame, and to understand the symmetries of the laws of electromagnetism. The Lorentz transformation is in accordance with Albert Einstein's special relativity, but was derived first.

The Lorentz transformation is a linear transformation. It may include a rotation of space; a rotation-free Lorentz transformation is called a Lorentz boost. In Minkowski space—the mathematical model of spacetime in special relativity—the Lorentz transformations preserve the spacetime interval between any two events. This property is the defining property of a Lorentz transformation. They describe only the transformations in which the spacetime event at the origin is left fixed. They can be considered as a hyperbolic rotation of Minkowski space. The more general set of transformations that also includes translations is known as the Poincaré group.

History

Many physicists—including Woldemar Voigt, George FitzGerald, Joseph Larmor, and Hendrik Lorentz himself—had been discussing the physics implied by these equations since 1887. Early in 1889, Oliver Heaviside had shown from Maxwell's equations that the electric field surrounding a spherical distribution of charge should cease to have spherical symmetry once the charge is in motion relative to the luminiferous aether. FitzGerald then conjectured that Heaviside's distortion result might be applied to a theory of intermolecular forces. Some months later, FitzGerald published the conjecture that bodies in motion are being contracted, in order to explain the baffling outcome of the 1887 aether-wind experiment of Michelson and Morley. In 1892, Lorentz independently presented the same idea in a more detailed manner, which was subsequently called FitzGerald–Lorentz contraction hypothesis. Their explanation was widely known before 1905.

Lorentz (1892–1904) and Larmor (1897–1900), who believed the luminiferous aether hypothesis, also looked for the transformation under which Maxwell's equations are invariant when transformed from the aether to a moving frame. They extended the FitzGerald–Lorentz contraction hypothesis and found out that the time coordinate has to be modified as well ("local time"). Henri Poincaré gave a physical interpretation to local time (to first order in v/c, the relative velocity of the two reference frames normalized to the speed of light) as the consequence of clock synchronization, under the assumption that the speed of light is constant in moving frames. Larmor is credited to have been the first to understand the crucial time dilation property inherent in his equations.

In 1905, Poincaré was the first to recognize that the transformation has the properties of a mathematical group,
and he named it after Lorentz.
Later in the same year Albert Einstein published what is now called special relativity, by deriving the Lorentz transformation under the assumptions of the principle of relativity and the constancy of the speed of light in any inertial reference frame, and by abandoning the mechanistic aether as unnecessary.

Derivation of the group of Lorentz transformations 

An event is something that happens at a certain point in spacetime, or more generally, the point in spacetime itself. In any inertial frame an event is specified by a time coordinate ct and a set of Cartesian coordinates  to specify position in space in that frame. Subscripts label individual events.

From Einstein's second postulate of relativity (invariance of c) it follows that:

in all inertial frames for events connected by light signals. The interval between any two events, not necessarily separated by light signals, is in fact invariant, i.e., independent of the state of relative motion of observers in different inertial frames, as is shown using homogeneity and isotropy of space. The transformation sought after thus must possess the property that:

Such transformations are called spacetime translations and are not dealt with further here. Then one observes that a linear solution preserving the origin of the simpler problem solves the general problem too:

(a solution satisfying the first formula automatically satisfies the second one as well; see polarization identity). Finding the solution to the simpler problem is just a matter of look-up in the theory of classical groups that preserve bilinear forms of various signature. First equation in  can be written more compactly as:

The alternative notation defined on the right is referred to as the relativistic dot product. Spacetime mathematically viewed as  endowed with this bilinear form is known as Minkowski space . The Lorentz transformation is thus an element of the group , the Lorentz group or, for those that prefer the other metric signature,  (also called the Lorentz group). One has:

The elements of the Lorentz group are rotations and boosts and mixes thereof. If the spacetime translations are included, then one obtains the inhomogeneous Lorentz group or the Poincaré group.

Generalities
The relations between the primed and unprimed spacetime coordinates are the Lorentz transformations, each coordinate in one frame is a linear function of all the coordinates in the other frame, and the inverse functions are the inverse transformation. Depending on how the frames move relative to each other, and how they are oriented in space relative to each other, other parameters that describe direction, speed, and orientation enter the transformation equations.

Transformations describing relative motion with constant (uniform) velocity and without rotation of the space coordinate axes are called Lorentz boosts or simply boosts, and the relative velocity between the frames is the parameter of the transformation. The other basic type of Lorentz transformation is rotation in the spatial coordinates only, these like boosts are inertial transformations since there is no relative motion, the frames are simply tilted (and not continuously rotating), and in this case quantities defining the rotation are the parameters of the transformation (e.g., axis–angle representation, or Euler angles, etc.). A combination of a rotation and boost is a homogeneous transformation, which transforms the origin back to the origin.

The full Lorentz group  also contains special transformations that are neither rotations nor boosts, but rather reflections in a plane through the origin. Two of these can be singled out; spatial inversion in which the spatial coordinates of all events are reversed in sign and temporal inversion in which the time coordinate for each event gets its sign reversed.

Boosts should not be conflated with mere displacements in spacetime; in this case, the coordinate systems are simply shifted and there is no relative motion. However, these also count as symmetries forced by special relativity since they leave the spacetime interval invariant. A combination of a rotation with a boost, followed by a shift in spacetime, is an inhomogeneous Lorentz transformation, an element of the Poincaré group, which is also called the inhomogeneous Lorentz group.

Physical formulation of Lorentz boosts

Coordinate transformation
 

A "stationary" observer in frame  defines events with coordinates .

At , the origins of both coordinate systems are the same, . In other words, the times and positions are coincident at this event. If all these hold, then the coordinate systems are said to be in standard configuration, or synchronized.

If an observer in  records an event , then an observer in  records the same event with coordinates

where  is the relative velocity between frames in the -direction,  is the speed of light, and

(lowercase gamma) is the Lorentz factor.

Here,  is the parameter of the transformation, for a given boost it is a constant number, but can take a continuous range of values. In the setup used here, positive relative velocity  is motion along the positive directions of the  axes, zero relative velocity  is no relative motion, while negative relative velocity  is relative motion along the negative directions of the  axes. The magnitude of relative velocity  cannot equal or exceed , so only subluminal speeds  are allowed.

The transformations are not defined if  is outside these limits. At the speed of light  is infinite, and faster than light  is a complex number, each of which make the transformations unphysical. The space and time coordinates are measurable quantities and numerically must be real numbers.

This has the equivalent effect of the coordinate system F′ boosted in the positive directions of the  axes, while the event does not change and is simply represented in another coordinate system, a passive transformation.

The inverse relations ( in terms of ) can be found by algebraically solving the original set of equations. A more efficient way is to use physical principles. Here  is the "stationary" frame while  is the "moving" frame. Thus if an observer in  notes an event , then an observer in  notes the same event with coordinates

and the value of  remains unchanged. This "trick" of simply reversing the direction of relative velocity while preserving its magnitude, and exchanging primed and unprimed variables, always applies to finding the inverse transformation of every boost in any direction.

which shows much more clearly the symmetry in the transformation.

The Lorentz transformations can also be derived in a way that resembles circular rotations in 3d space using the hyperbolic functions. For the boost in the  direction, the results are

where  (lowercase zeta) is a parameter called rapidity (many other symbols are used, including ). Given the strong resemblance to rotations of spatial coordinates in 3d space in the Cartesian xy, yz, and zx planes, a Lorentz boost can be thought of as a hyperbolic rotation of spacetime coordinates in the xt, yt, and zt Cartesian-time planes of 4d Minkowski space. The parameter  is the hyperbolic angle of rotation, analogous to the ordinary angle for circular rotations. This transformation can be illustrated with a Minkowski diagram.

The hyperbolic functions arise from the difference between the squares of the time and spatial coordinates in the spacetime interval, rather than a sum. Squaring and subtracting the results, one can derive hyperbolic curves of constant coordinate values but varying , which parametrizes the curves according to the identity

The definition

provides the link between a constant value of rapidity, and the slope of the  axis in spacetime. A consequence these two hyperbolic formulae is an identity that matches the Lorentz factor

Taking the inverse hyperbolic tangent gives the rapidity 

Since , it follows .

The inverse transformations are obtained by exchanging primed and unprimed quantities to switch the coordinate frames, and negating rapidity  since this is equivalent to negating the relative velocity. Therefore,

So far the Lorentz transformations have been applied to one event. If there are two events, there is a spatial separation and time interval between them. It follows from the linearity of the Lorentz transformations that two values of space and time coordinates can be chosen, the Lorentz transformations can be applied to each, then subtracted to get the Lorentz transformations of the differences;

with inverse relations

where  (uppercase delta) indicates a difference of quantities; e.g.,  for two values of  coordinates, and so on.

These transformations on differences rather than spatial points or instants of time are useful for a number of reasons:
 in calculations and experiments, it is lengths between two points or time intervals that are measured or of interest (e.g., the length of a moving vehicle, or time duration it takes to travel from one place to another),
 the transformations of velocity can be readily derived by making the difference infinitesimally small and dividing the equations, and the process repeated for the transformation of acceleration,

Physical implications

A critical requirement of the Lorentz transformations is the invariance of the speed of light, a fact used in their derivation, and contained in the transformations themselves.

For relative speeds much less than the speed of light, the Lorentz transformations reduce to the Galilean transformation

in accordance with the correspondence principle. It is sometimes said that nonrelativistic physics is a physics of "instantaneous action at a distance".

Three counterintuitive, but correct, predictions of the transformations are:
Relativity of simultaneity
Time dilation
Either way, each observer measures the time interval between ticks of a moving clock to be longer by a factor  than the time interval between ticks of his own clock.
Length contraction
 Suppose there is a rod at rest in  aligned along the x axis, with length . In , the rod moves with velocity , so its length must be measured by taking two simultaneous measurements at opposite ends. Under these conditions, the inverse Lorentz transform shows that . So each observer measures the distance between the end points of a moving rod to be shorter by a factor  than the end points of an identical rod at rest in his own frame. Length contraction affects any geometric quantity related to lengths, so from the perspective of a moving observer, areas and volumes will also appear to shrink along the direction of motion.

Vector transformations

The use of vectors allows positions and velocities to be expressed in arbitrary directions compactly. A single boost in any direction depends on the full relative velocity vector  with a magnitude  that cannot equal or exceed , so that .

Only time and the coordinates parallel to the direction of relative motion change, while those coordinates perpendicular do not.

then the transformations are

where  is the dot product. The Lorentz factor  retains its definition for a boost in any direction, since it depends only on the magnitude of the relative velocity. The definition  with magnitude  is also used by some authors.

Accumulating the results gives the full transformations,

It is not convenient for multiple boosts.

The vectorial relation between relative velocity and rapidity is

and the "rapidity vector" can be defined as

each of which serves as a useful abbreviation in some contexts.

Transformation of velocities

Defining the coordinate velocities and Lorentz factor by

taking the differentials in the coordinates and time of the vector transformations, then dividing equations, leads to

They can also be for a third inertial frame (say F′′), in which case they must be constant.

The transformation of velocity is useful in stellar aberration, the Fizeau experiment, and the relativistic Doppler effect.

The Lorentz transformations of acceleration can be similarly obtained by taking differentials in the velocity vectors, and dividing these by the time differential.

Transformation of other quantities

implies the quantities transform under Lorentz transformations similar to the transformation of spacetime coordinates;

The quantities  collectively make up a four-vector, where  is the "timelike component", and  the "spacelike component".

For a given object (e.g., particle, fluid, field, material), if  or  correspond to properties specific to the object like its charge density, mass density, spin, etc., its properties can be fixed in the rest frame of that object. Then the Lorentz transformations give the corresponding properties in a frame moving relative to the object with constant velocity. This breaks some notions taken for granted in non-relativistic physics. For example, the energy  of an object is a scalar in non-relativistic mechanics, but not in relativistic mechanics because energy changes under Lorentz transformations; its value is different for various inertial frames. In the rest frame of an object, it has a rest energy and zero momentum. In a boosted frame its energy is different and it appears to have a momentum. Similarly, in non-relativistic quantum mechanics the spin of a particle is a constant vector, but in relativistic quantum mechanics spin  depends on relative motion. In the rest frame of the particle, the spin pseudovector can be fixed to be its ordinary non-relativistic spin with a zero timelike quantity , however a boosted observer will perceive a nonzero timelike component and an altered spin.

Not all quantities are invariant in the form as shown above, for example orbital angular momentum  does not have a timelike quantity, and neither does the electric field  nor the magnetic field . Applying this definition using the transformations of coordinates and momentum leads to the transformation of angular momentum. It turns out  transforms with another vector quantity  related to boosts, see relativistic angular momentum for details. A method of deriving the EM field transformations in an efficient way which also illustrates the unit of the electromagnetic field uses tensor algebra, given below.

Mathematical formulation

Throughout, italic non-bold capital letters are 4×4 matrices, while non-italic bold letters are 3×3 matrices.

Homogeneous Lorentz group

Writing the coordinates in column vectors and the Minkowski metric  as a square matrix

the spacetime interval takes the form (superscript  denotes transpose)

and is invariant under a Lorentz transformation

where  is a square matrix which can depend on parameters.

The set of all Lorentz transformations Λ in this article is denoted . This set together with matrix multiplication forms a group, in this context known as the Lorentz group. Also, the above expression  is a quadratic form of signature (3,1) on spacetime, and the group of transformations which leaves this quadratic form invariant is the indefinite orthogonal group O(3,1), a Lie group. In other words, the Lorentz group is O(3,1). As presented in this article, any Lie groups mentioned are matrix Lie groups. In this context the operation of composition amounts to matrix multiplication.

From the invariance of the spacetime interval it follows

and this matrix equation contains the general conditions on the Lorentz transformation to ensure invariance of the spacetime interval. Taking the determinant of the equation using the product rule gives immediately

Writing the Minkowski metric as a block matrix, and the Lorentz transformation in the most general form,

Not much information can be directly extracted from all the conditions, however one of the results

is useful;  always so it follows that

The negative inequality may be unexpected, because  multiplies the time coordinate and this has an effect on time symmetry. If the positive equality holds, then  is the Lorentz factor.

The determinant and inequality provide four ways to classify Lorentz Transformations (herein LTs for brevity). Any particular LT has only one determinant sign and only one inequality. There are four sets which include every possible pair given by the intersections ("n"-shaped symbol meaning "and") of these classifying sets.

where "+" and "−" indicate the determinant sign, while "↑" for ≥ and "↓" for ≤ denote the inequalities.

The full Lorentz group splits into the union ("u"-shaped symbol meaning "or") of four disjoint sets

A subgroup of a group must be closed under the same operation of the group (here matrix multiplication). This is not always the case: the composition of two antichronous Lorentz transformations is orthochronous, and the composition of two improper Lorentz transformations is proper. ,) do not form subgroups.

Proper transformations

If a Lorentz covariant 4-vector is measured in one inertial frame with result , and the same measurement made in another inertial frame (with the same orientation and origin) gives result , the two results will be related by

The matrix is given by

This formula represents a passive transformation, as it describes how the coordinates of the measured quantity changes from the unprimed frame to the primed frame.

Successive transformations act on the left.

Also, each of these compositions is not a single boost, but they are still Lorentz transformations they each preserve the spacetime interval. The rotation in block matrix form is simply

where  is a 3d rotation matrix, which rotates any 3d vector in one sense (active transformation), or equivalently the coordinate frame in the opposite sense (passive transformation). In a composition of boosts, the  matrix is named the Wigner rotation, and gives rise to the Thomas precession.

The rotation is about an axis in the direction of a unit vector , through angle  (positive anticlockwise, negative clockwise, according to the right-hand rule). The "axis-angle vector"

will serve as a useful abbreviation.

Spatial rotations alone are also Lorentz transformations they leave the spacetime interval invariant. Like boosts, successive rotations about different axes do not commute. Unlike boosts, the composition of any two rotations is equivalent to a single rotation. Some other similarities and differences between the boost and rotation matrices include:
 identity transformation for no relative motion/rotation: 
 unit determinant: . This property makes them proper transformations.
 matrix symmetry:  is symmetric (equals transpose), while  is nonsymmetric but orthogonal (transpose equals inverse).

The most general proper Lorentz transformation  includes a boost and rotation together, and is a nonsymmetric matrix. An explicit form of the general Lorentz transformation is cumbersome to write down and will not be given here. Nevertheless, closed form expressions for the transformation matrices will be given below using group theoretical arguments.

The Lie group SO+(3,1)

The set of transformations

with matrix multiplication as the operation of composition forms a group, called the "restricted Lorentz group", and is the special indefinite orthogonal group SO+(3,1). (The plus sign indicates that it preserves the orientation of the temporal dimension).

For simplicity, look at the infinitesimal Lorentz boost in the x direction (examining a boost in any other direction, or rotation about any axis, follows an identical procedure).

For now,  is defined by this result (its significance will be explained shortly). In the limit of an infinite number of infinitely small steps, the finite boost transformation in the form of a matrix exponential is obtained

where the limit definition of the exponential has been used (see also characterizations of the exponential function). More generally

Expanding the exponentials in their Taylor series obtains

which compactly reproduce the boost and rotation matrices as given in the previous section.

It has been stated that the general proper Lorentz transformation is a product of a boost and rotation. At the infinitesimal level the product

is commutative because only linear terms are required (products like  and  count as higher order terms and are negligible). Taking the limit as before leads to the finite transformation in the form of an exponential

The converse is also true, but the decomposition of a finite general Lorentz transformation into such factors is nontrivial. In particular,

because the generators do not commute. For a description of how to find the factors of a general Lorentz transformation in terms of a boost and a rotation in principle (this usually does not yield an intelligible expression in terms of generators  and ), see Wigner rotation. If, on the other hand, the decomposition is given in terms of the generators, and one wants to find the product in terms of the generators, then the Baker–Campbell–Hausdorff formula applies.

The Lie algebra so(3,1)

Lorentz generators can be added together, or multiplied by real numbers, to obtain more Lorentz generators. In other words, the set of all Lorentz generators

together with the operations of ordinary matrix addition and multiplication of a matrix by a number, forms a vector space over the real numbers. The generators  form a basis set of V, and the components of the axis-angle and rapidity vectors, are the coordinates of a Lorentz generator with respect to this basis.

Three of the commutation relations of the Lorentz generators are

where the bracket  is known as the commutator, and the other relations can be found by taking cyclic permutations of x, y, z components (i.e. change x to y, y to z, and z to x, repeat).

These commutation relations, and the vector space of generators, fulfill the definition of the Lie algebra . In summary, a Lie algebra is defined as a vector space V over a field of numbers, and with a binary operation [ , ] (called a Lie bracket in this context) on the elements of the vector space, satisfying the axioms of bilinearity, alternatization, and the Jacobi identity. Here the operation [ , ] is the commutator which satisfies all of these axioms, the vector space is the set of Lorentz generators V as given previously, and the field is the set of real numbers.

Linking terminology used in mathematics and physics: A group generator is any element of the Lie algebra. A group parameter is a component of a coordinate vector representing an arbitrary element of the Lie algebra with respect to some basis. A basis, then, is a set of generators being a basis of the Lie algebra in the usual vector space sense.

The exponential map from the Lie algebra to the Lie group,

provides a one-to-one correspondence between small enough neighborhoods of the origin of the Lie algebra and neighborhoods of the identity element of the Lie group. In the case of the Lorentz group, the exponential map is just the matrix exponential. Globally, the exponential map is not one-to-one, but in the case of the Lorentz group, it is surjective (onto). Hence any group element in the connected component of the identity can be expressed as an exponential of an element of the Lie algebra.

Improper transformations

Lorentz transformations also include parity inversion

which negates all the spatial coordinates only, and time reversal

which negates the time coordinate only, because these transformations leave the spacetime interval invariant. Here  is the 3d identity matrix. These are both symmetric, they are their own inverses (see involution (mathematics)), and each have determinant −1. This latter property makes them improper transformations.

Inhomogeneous Lorentz group 

Two other spacetime symmetries have not been accounted for. For the spacetime interval to be invariant, it can be shown that it is necessary and sufficient for the coordinate transformation to be of the form

where C is a constant column containing translations in time and space. If C ≠ 0, this is an inhomogeneous Lorentz transformation or Poincaré transformation. If C = 0, this is a homogeneous Lorentz transformation. Poincaré transformations are not dealt further in this article.

Tensor formulation

Contravariant vectors 
Writing the general matrix transformation of coordinates as the matrix equation

allows the transformation of other physical quantities that cannot be expressed as four-vectors; e.g., tensors or spinors of any order in 4d spacetime, to be defined. In the corresponding tensor index notation, the above matrix expression is

where lower and upper indices label covariant and contravariant components respectively, and the summation convention is applied. It is a standard convention to use Greek indices that take the value 0 for time components, and 1, 2, 3 for space components, while Latin indices simply take the values 1, 2, 3, for spatial components (the opposite for Landau and Lifshitz). Note that the first index (reading left to right) corresponds in the matrix notation to a row index. The second index corresponds to the column index.

The transformation matrix is universal for all four-vectors, not just 4-dimensional spacetime coordinates. If  is any four-vector, then in tensor index notation 

Alternatively, one writes  in which the primed indices denote the indices of A in the primed frame. For a general -component object one may write  where  is the appropriate representation of the Lorentz group, an  matrix for every . E.g., if  is a bispinor, then the indices are called Dirac indices.

Covariant vectors 
There are also vector quantities with covariant indices. They are generally obtained from their corresponding objects with contravariant indices by the operation of lowering an index; e.g.,

where  is the metric tensor. (The linked article also provides more information about what the operation of raising and lowering indices really is mathematically.) The inverse of this transformation is given by

As it happens, . This is referred to as raising an index. To transform a covariant vector , first raise its index, then transform it according to the same rule as for contravariant -vectors, then finally lower the index;

But 

That is, it is the -component of the inverse Lorentz transformation. One defines (as a matter of notation),

and may in this notation write

Now for a subtlety. The implied summation on the right hand side of

is running over a row index of the matrix representing . Thus, in terms of matrices, this transformation should be thought of as the inverse transpose of  acting on the column vector . That is, in pure matrix notation,

This means exactly that covariant vectors (thought of as column matrices) transform according to the dual representation of the standard representation of the Lorentz group.

Tensors 

The second step uses the bilinearity of the tensor product and the last step defines a 2-tensor on component form, or rather, it just renames the tensor .

These observations generalize in an obvious way to more factors, and using the fact that a general tensor on a vector space  can be written as a sum of a coefficient (component!) times tensor products of basis vectors and basis covectors, one arrives at the transformation law for any tensor quantity . It is given by

where  is defined above. This form can generally be reduced to the form for general -component objects given above with a single matrix operating on column vectors. This latter form is sometimes preferred; e.g., for the electromagnetic field tensor.

Transformation of the electromagnetic field 

Lorentz transformations can also be used to illustrate that the magnetic field  and electric field  are simply different aspects of the same force — the electromagnetic force, as a consequence of relative motion between electric charges and observers. The fact that the electromagnetic field shows relativistic effects becomes clear by carrying out a simple thought experiment.
 An observer measures a charge at rest in frame F. The observer will detect a static electric field.  As the charge is stationary in this frame, there is no electric current, so the observer does not observe any magnetic field.
 The other observer in frame F′ moves at velocity  relative to F and the charge. This observer sees a different electric field because the charge moves at velocity  in their rest frame. The motion of the charge corresponds to an electric current, and thus the observer in frame F′ also sees a magnetic field.

The electric and magnetic fields transform differently from space and time, but exactly the same way as relativistic angular momentum and the boost vector.

The electromagnetic field strength tensor is given by

in SI units. In relativity, the Gaussian system of units is often preferred over SI units, even in texts whose main choice of units is SI units, because in it the electric field  and the magnetic induction  have the same units making the appearance of the electromagnetic field tensor more natural. Consider a Lorentz boost in the -direction. It is given by

where the field tensor is displayed side by side for easiest possible reference in the manipulations below.

The general transformation law  becomes

For the magnetic field one obtains

For the electric field results

Here,  is used. These results can be summarized by

and are independent of the metric signature. For SI units, substitute .  refer to this last form as the  view as opposed to the geometric view represented by the tensor expression

and make a strong point of the ease with which results that are difficult to achieve using the  view can be obtained and understood. Only objects that have well defined Lorentz transformation properties (in fact under any smooth coordinate transformation) are geometric objects. In the geometric view, the electromagnetic field is a six-dimensional geometric object in spacetime as opposed to two interdependent, but separate, 3-vector fields in space and time. The mathematical underpinnings are equations  and  that immediately yield . One should note that the primed and unprimed tensors refer to the same event in spacetime. Thus the complete equation with spacetime dependence is

Length contraction has an effect on charge density  and current density , and time dilation has an effect on the rate of flow of charge (current), so charge and current distributions must transform in a related way under a boost. It turns out they transform exactly like the space-time and energy-momentum four-vectors,

or, in the simpler geometric view,

Charge density transforms as the time component of a four-vector. It is a rotational scalar. The current density is a 3-vector.

The Maxwell equations are invariant under Lorentz transformations.

Spinors 
Equation  hold unmodified for any representation of the Lorentz group, including the bispinor representation.

The above equation could, for instance, be the transformation of a state in Fock space describing two free electrons.

Transformation of general fields 
A general noninteracting multi-particle state (Fock space state) in quantum field theory transforms according to the rule

See also

Footnotes

Notes

References

Websites

Papers

 
 
 
 
 
 
 . See also: English translation.
 
  
  eqn (55).

Books

Further reading

External links

 Derivation of the Lorentz transformations. This web page contains a more detailed derivation of the Lorentz transformation with special emphasis on group properties.
 The Paradox of Special Relativity.  This webpage poses a problem, the solution of which is the Lorentz transformation, which is presented graphically in its next page.
 Relativity – a chapter from an online textbook
 Warp Special Relativity Simulator. A computer program demonstrating the Lorentz transformations on everyday objects.
  visualizing the Lorentz transformation.
 MinutePhysics video on YouTube explaining and visualizing the Lorentz transformation with a mechanical Minkowski diagram
 Interactive graph on Desmos (graphing) showing Lorentz transformations with a virtual Minkowski diagram
 Interactive graph on Desmos showing Lorentz transformations with points and hyperbolas
 Lorentz Frames Animated from John de Pillis.  Online Flash animations of Galilean and Lorentz frames, various paradoxes, EM wave phenomena, etc.

Special relativity
Theoretical physics
Mathematical physics
Spacetime
Coordinate systems
Hendrik Lorentz